Maria Barbella (October 24, 1868 – March 24, 1950) was an Italian-born American woman. Erroneously known as Maria Barberi at the time, she was the second woman sentenced to die in the electric chair. She was convicted of killing her lover in 1895, but the ruling was overturned in 1896 and she was freed. Her trial became a cause célèbre in the late 19th century.

Life
Maria Barbella was born in Ferrandina, Basilicata, Italy. Her family immigrated to Mulberry Bend, New York, in 1892. After living in the United States for nearly a year, Maria Barbella met Domenico Cataldo, who was from the same region of Italy. She worked in a factory and every day she would pass Cataldo’s shoeshine booth. They spent much time together but Maria kept these meetings secret from her overprotective father, Michele. But he did find out about Domenico and forbade Maria to ever see or speak to him again. However, Domenico continued to pursue Maria until she finally agreed to see him again.

One day Cataldo took her to a boarding house, where he allegedly drugged her with the drink he bought her, then raped her. Maria demanded that he marry her. Cataldo showed her a savings book with a $400 deposit and promised he would. Maria continued to live with him at the boarding house, and Cataldo continued to put the marriage off for several months. He was, in fact, already married to a woman in Italy and they had children.

Devastated when Cataldo told her that he was ending their relationship and returning to Italy, Barbella told her mother about the situation. Her mother confronted Cataldo and insisted he marry Barbella, but he said he would only do that if they paid him $200. In New York City on April 26, 1895, at approximately 9:30am, Domenico Cataldo was playing cards in a saloon on East 13th Street, and had planned to board a ship leaving for Italy that afternoon. Barbella entered the bar and there was a brief exchange. "Only a pig can marry you!" were his last words. Barbella produced a straight razor and slashed his neck so swiftly Cataldo had no chance to scream. He staggered out the door, clutching his throat with both hands, knocking Barbella over, spraying blood everywhere. Finally, as he reached Avenue A, he lurched off the curb and fell twitching into the gutter, where he died.

Trial
Barbella was arrested and put in The New York Halls of Justice and House of Detention (otherwise known as "The Tombs") for 2.5 months. Her appointed attorneys were Amos Evans and Henry Sedgwick. The trial began on July 11. This case stirred up controversy because Italians felt that the verdict was unjust since there were no Italians in the jury. At the time of the trial, Barbella was unable to speak or understand English. She admitted everything: how she slit his throat and how he ran after her, but couldn’t reach her and had dropped dead. The jury was shown to have felt sympathy for her case; however, according to Recorder Goff, "The verdict was in accordance with the facts, and no other verdict could, in view of the evidence, have been considered."  The jury declared Barbella guilty and she was sent to Sing Sing prison where she was sentenced to death by electric chair occurring on August 19, 1895. She was the second woman sentenced to be executed by electric chair (after serial killer Lizzie Halliday's commuted 1894 conviction).

Second trial and release

Many complained to Governor Levi Morton about how the situation was handled, but it seemed nothing could be done. She was granted an appeal on the basis of the judge's jury instructions, which explicitly argued in favor of conviction. On November 16, 1896, she was given a second trial. This time, counsel presented a much more sympathetic case: that she was a rape victim whose experience exacerbated her preexisting epilepsy. She allegedly suffered a seizure and lost her reason. She was found not guilty.

Later life
After her release from prison, she again made headlines for rescuing a neighbor who had accidentally set herself on fire. Barbella grabbed a blanket and beat the fire out with her hands.
Barbella married an Italian immigrant named Francesco Paolo Bruno on November 4, 1897. In 1899, she had a son named Frederick. In 1902, she was living with her parents, and her husband. In a 1940 census, she is living as Mary di Chiara with her second husband, Ernesto, on Pike Street in Manhattan. She died on March 24, 1950, and is buried in the Old Calvary cemetery as Mary di Chiara.

In popular culture
"Illicit and Lethal" - episode about Maria Barbella's life from the documentary Deadly Women, originally aired on Discovery Channel in 2017.

The November 1st, 2019 episode of the podcast The Memory Palace tells her story.

References

Fleischer, Lawrence.  "Maria Barbella: The Unwritten Law and the Code of Honor in Gilded Age New York."  From In Our Own Voices: Multidisciplinary Perspectives on Italian and Italian American Women.  Boca Raton, Florida: Bordighera Press, 2003, pgs. 67-74.
Messina, Elizabeth G.  "Women and Capital Punishment: The Trials of Maria Barbella."  From In Our Own Voices: Multidisciplinary Perspectives on Italian and Italian American Women.  Boca Raton, Florida: Bordighera Press, 2003, pgs. 53-65.
Pucci, Idanna.  The Trials of Maria Barbella.  New York: Vintage, 1996.
 "The Lady of Sing Sing" by Idanna Pucci NY NY Tiller Press, 2020, pages 276-277.

People convicted of murder by New York (state)
American people convicted of murder
Italian people convicted of murder
Italian people imprisoned abroad
Italian emigrants to the United States
People from the Province of Matera
American female murderers
Italian female murderers
1868 births
20th-century deaths
Year of death unknown
Inmates of Sing Sing